The 2nd Corps was one of five, later seven corps in the Army of the Republic of Bosnia and Herzegovina established in early 1992.

History 
Just like the 1st Corps, the 2nd Corps was established early in 1992. This corps along with the 5th Corps had more success than the other Corps.

Operational zones 
The 2nd Corps was responsible for the following districts: Tuzla (where were the headquarters of the corps), Doboj, Bijeljina, Srebrenica, Žepa, Zvornik.

Commanders 
1st Commander: Major general Željko Knez
2nd Commander: Brigadier Hazim Šadić
3rd Commander: Brigadier Sead Delić

Units 
The 2nd Corps had 8 operational groups:

1st Operational Group (Gradačac)
21st Brigade
107th Motorized Brigade "Zmaj od Bosne" (Gradačac)
108th Motorized Brigade (Brčko)
108th HVO Brigade
208th Brigade
2nd Operational Group (Gračanica)
109th Mountain Brigade (Doboj)
111th Brigade (Gračanica)
117th Brigade "Džemisetski Golubovi"  (Lukavac)
3rd Operational Group (Kladanj)
Commander: Erdin Hrustić
1st Olovo Brigade
121st Mountain Brigade (Kladanj)
302nd Brigade
4th Operational Group (Kalesija)
205th Brigade (Kalesija)
206th Mountain Brigade (Zvornik)
207th Mountain Brigade (Tešanj)
5th Operational Group (Tuzla)
1st Tuzla Brigade
2nd Tuzla Brigade
3rd Tuzla Brigade
6th Operational Group (Živinice)
Commander: Hasan Muratović
116th Mountain Brigade 
118th Brigade
119th Mountain Brigade (Banovići)
Commander: Nihad Šehović
210th Brigade
7th/South Operational Group (Tesanj)(Maglaj)
110th HVO Brigade (Žepče)
111th HVO Brigade (Usora)
201st Brigade (Maglaj)
Commander: Colonel Esad Hindić
202nd Mountain Brigade (Teslić)
203rd Motorized Brigade (Doboj)
204th Mountain Brigade (Teslić) (Nov. 1994, Operational Group to 3rd Corps)
207th Brigade
8th Operational Group (Srebrenica)
Commander: Naser Orić
Deputy Commander: Fahrudin Alić
180th Brigade
181st Brigade
183rd Brigade
184th Brigade
283rd Brigade
Commander: Major Huso Halilović
285th Light Mountain Brigade (Žepa)
Commander: Colonel Avdo Palić

Arms
 Zastava M70  active since 1992–1995, 1995–present
 M-16  active since 1994–1996, 1996–present
 AK-47  active since 1991–1995, 1996–present
 AR-15  active since 1994–present (used by Tuzla special forces today)

Military operations and engagements 
 Battle of Budučin Potok
 Operation "Proljece" 1994
 Battle for Ozren and Vozuca
 Operation "Farz 95"

References 

Corps of the Army of the Republic of Bosnia and Herzegovina
1992 establishments in Bosnia and Herzegovina
History of Tuzla